Mehmet Şerefettin Yaltkaya (17 November 1880 – 23 April 1947) was a Turkish religious scholar, who served as the 2nd president of religious affairs of the Republic of Turkey from 1942 until his death in 1947. He is known for leading the funeral prayer of Mustafa Kemal Atatürk on 19 November 1938 at the Dolmabahçe Palace in Turkish. More than 60 of his works are available.

He was born in Istanbul. After graduating from the Davutpaşa Middle School, he graduated from the Male Teachers' College for Secondary Schools. In 1924, he became a lecturer in the history of remark at the Istanbul University Faculty of Theology, and later became a distinguished professor in the field of Islam and its philosophy. On November 19, 1938, while he was the director of the Institute of Islamic Studies, he led Ataturk's funeral prayer by a limited congregation. He was appointed as the president of religious affairs on January 14, 1942, and died on April 23, 1947 while on duty. His grave is in Cebeci Asri Cemetery in Ankara.

His library was given to the Ankara University Faculty of Language and History–Geography in accordance with his will. He was a supporter of the Turkish War of Independence and Ataturk's reforms such as Turkish adhan.

See also 

 Death and state funeral of Mustafa Kemal Atatürk
 Sicilian Questions

External link 
 https://www.diyanet.gov.tr/en-US/

References 

1880 births
1947 deaths